Clwt-y-bont is a village in Gwynedd, Wales, lying just to the south of Deiniolen. The two villages form one urban unit.
Both were built in the early 19th century to house workers in the Dinorwig slate quarry, and both suffered when the quarry was closed in 1969.

Foundation
The Welsh word clwt means "patch" and bont means "bridge".

Both Clwt y bont and Deiniolen were built in the early 19th century to house workers in the Dinorwig slate quarry.
Houses include single houses and terraces from the 1830s.
Clwt y Bont seems relatively unplanned, and has the short terraces built into the slope typical of early Gwynedd industrial settlement.
The plan was dictated by the line of the 1825 Dinorwic Railway.

History
After the 1860s few new buildings were erected until social housing was built in the 1940s.
In 1870 the village was part of the parish of Llanddeiniolen.
Most of the inhabitants were employed by the Dinorwig-slate quarries.
The novelist Ann Harriet Hughes (1852–1910) married a doctor in Clwt-y-bont, where she lived for a period.
The large Pentre Helen Housing Estate was built in the late 1930s, and had the effect of linking Deiniolen and Clwt y Bont into one village.
The economy suffered badly when the Dinorwic Quarry was closed in 1969.

The locations of some of the mills are still visible, and some of the larger ones are still in use as workshops.
There are limited shops and other facilities in the village.
The Libanus chapel, and its sister chapel Sardis, are affiliated to the Baptist Union of Wales and are under the pastoral care of the minister of Capel Penuel in Bangor.
There are many sites for boulder climbers on the hillside between the Fachwen road and Clwt y Bont.

Notes

Sources

Villages in Gwynedd
Llanddeiniolen
Mining communities in Wales